Beka Tsiklauri (born Tbilisi, February 9, 1989) is a Georgian rugby union player who plays as a fullback.

He currently plays for Locomotive in the Georgia Championship and the Georgia national team.

He has 22 caps for Georgia since his debut in 2008, with 4 tries, 11 conversions, 15 penalties and 2 drop goals scored, 93 points in aggregate. He was called for the 2015 Rugby World Cup, playing in two games and scoring a try against the All Blacks.

References

1989 births
Rugby union players from Georgia (country)
Living people
Rugby union players from Tbilisi
Rugby union fullbacks
Georgia international rugby union players